Social Finance is a not for profit consultancy organisation that partners with governments, service providers, the voluntary sector and the financial community to find better ways of tackling social problems in the UK and globally. Founded in 2007, they have helped pioneer a series of programmes to improve outcomes for individuals with complex needs. Their innovations include the Social Impact Bonds (SIB) model which has mobilised more than £500 million globally in areas such as  offender rehabilitation, children and family, homelessness and housing, young people at risk of becoming NEET, mental health and employment, loneliness and social isolation, and domestic violence.

History
Social Finance's initial team supported the work of the Commission on Unclaimed Assets, which recommended the establishment of a Social Investment Bank in March 2007 and in turn developed the blueprint for what is now named Big Society Capital. Initially financed by a group of philanthropists, later financial support included charitable trusts and foundations including: Esmée Fairbairn Foundation, Rockefeller Foundation and the Big Lottery Fund.

Social Finance helped develop the first Social Impact Bond project in the world in the UK in 2010, a six-year social impact bond pilot scheme run by Social Finance to see around 3,000 short-term prisoners from Peterborough prison, serving less than 12 months, receiving intensive interventions both in prison and in the community. Funding from investors outside government was initially used to pay for the services, which were delivered by Third Sector providers with a proven track record of working with offenders. If re-offending is not reduced by at least 7.5% through all tranches, the investors will receive no recompense. In August 2014, the first set of results were released, showing that the Social Impact Bond reduced reoffending by 8.4 per cent. This was not high enough to trigger any repayments to investors at this point (10% reduction would have been necessary for payments to investors by August 2014) but was on track for payments to investors in the next tranche – as an 8.4% reduction is in line with the overall reduction rate needed.

In January 2011, Social Finance US was launched to bring social impact bonds to the US market. Today the "Social Finance Global Network" includes Social Finance UK, Social Finance US, Social Finance Israel, Social Finance India, and Social Finance Netherlands.

Social impact bonds

There are a range of interpretations of what the term ‘social impact bond’ means. Broadly speaking, social impact bonds are a type of bond, but not the most common type. While they operate over a fixed period of time, they do not offer a fixed rate of return. Repayment to investors is contingent upon specified social outcomes being achieved. Therefore, in terms of investment risk, social impact bonds are more similar to that of a structured product or an equity investment.

Social Finance UK describes social impact bonds as "a public-private partnership which funds effective social services through a performance-based contract."

References

External links
 Social Finance

Social enterprises
2007 establishments in the United Kingdom
Organizations established in 2007
Organisations based in London
Social finance